Source Theatre Company was a non-profit theater company located in Washington, D.C. Formed 1977, it ceased production in 2002 and legally disbanded in 2006.  While active it performed at 1835 14th Street NW, Washington DC in the 14th Street corridor of Washington, D.C.

Facilities

The Source Theatre Company performed at the Source Theatre at 1835 14th St NW. On the main floor the building included a 120-seat black box performance space with loading dock and dressing rooms. The second floor had a rehearsal room, conference room, and office space

Theatrical Focus
Source Theatre Company focused on providing opportunities for the emerging theater artist, through the production of new plays, reinterpretation of the classics, non traditional casting, and performing in non established performance space.

Awards
During the years that Helen Hayes Awards overlapped with the Source Theatre Company's productions, they received 50 nominations for and won 6 of the awards.

Epilogue
In the years since the Source Theatre Company disbanded, its facility at 1835 14th St NW has been used by several theatrical organizations to include:
Constellation Theatre Company
Washington Improv Theater
The In Series

References

Theatre companies in Washington, D.C.
Regional theatre in the United States
1977 establishments in Washington, D.C.